The Portland Trust is a British non-profit ‘action tank’ whose mission is to promote peace and stability between Israelis and Palestinians through economic development.
They work with a range of partners to help develop the Palestinian private sector and relieve poverty through entrepreneurship in Israel.

The Portland Trust was founded in London in 2003 by Sir Ronald Cohen, co-founder and former chairman of the private equity firm Apax Partners, together with Sir Harry Solomon, co-founder and former chairman and CEO of Hillsdown Holdings.
 
The other trustees are Lord Freud, former Minister for Welfare Reform in the British government and former vice chairman of UBS Investment Banking, and Mick Davis, founding partner of x2 Resources.
 
In June 2005 The Portland Trust opened an office in Tel-Aviv, the chair is Yossi Bachar and the managing director is Gal Hauyt.

In April 2006, an office was opened in Ramallah under the direction of Samir Hulileh the current managing director is Kamel Husseini.
 
Nicola Cobbold has been the CEO of The Portland Trust between January 2009 and September 2015. Baron Frankal has been the CEO since 2021.

Aims and focus 
They are involved in a number of important initiatives, including the development of financial and economic infrastructure, trade and investment and entrepreneurship.
 
Since its launch in 2003, the Trust has consistently highlighted the important role of economics in resolving the Middle East conflict. It is a critical element alongside improved security and political process to achieve a sustainable and lasting peace. 
 
Its approach is supported by evidence from other conflict situations – Northern Ireland, Bosnia Herzegovina and more broadly through research carried out jointly with the International Institute for Strategic Studies in London. In Northern Ireland economic discussions became a platform for political settlement. The private sector pushed for moderation, and during difficult periods of the conflict, public sector financial support and employment underpinned the economy.

Publications  
It publishes printed materials on a regular basis, including: 
 the monthly Palestinian Economic Bulletin
 Beyond Aid: A Palestinian Private Sector Initiative for Investment, Growth and Employment
 Economics and Peacemaking: A paper on Bosnia and Herzegovina
 Economics and Peacemaking: A paper on Northern Ireland
 Beyond Conflict - 2004 Report
 Financing Palestinian SMEs, Palestine Economic Policy Research Institute (MAS) - September 2005
 Economics and Conflict Resolution with the International Institute for Strategic Studies - 2009
 Palestinian Exports: Best Practice - December 2008

Offices 
The Trust has offices in the UK (London), Israel (Tel Aviv), Palestine (Ramallah) and Israel (Baruch).

Projects 
The Portland Trust is involved in a range of projects in Israel and the West Bank including:

Economic Infrastructure

 Affordable Housing Programme

A private sector initiative designed to build affordable housing for new communities and neighbourhoods across the West Bank.

 Alternative and Renewable Energy

The Portland Trust is working with the Palestinian Authority to explore how it could diversify its sources of electricity using renewable energy.

 Regional Infrastructure Trunk Council (RITC)

A mechanism designed to coordinate regional infrastructure development.

 
Financial Infrastructure

 Social Investment and Social Finance

Innovative financing to deliver sustainable funding for Israel's social sector.
 
 Palestinian Loan Guarantees

A facility designed to help small and medium-sized Palestinian firms access finance from the local banking sector.

 Private Sector Pensions

The establishment of a private sector pension system in the Palestinian Territory.

 The Galilee Loan Guarantee Programme

A project to support the provision of loan guarantees and technical assistance to smaller businesses in the poorer part of northern Israel.

 The Negev and Galilee Loan Guarantee Programme

Financial support for loan guarantees and technical assistance to small businesses in the poorer parts of southern and northern Israel.

 Private Sector Grant Facility

A private sector grant leveraging programme to boost Palestinian economic development.

 Palestine Securities Exchange (PEX) Roadshow

Helping listed Palestinian companies access potential British investors.

 Microfinance

A three-year project to strengthen the Palestinian microfinance sector.

 
Trade and Investment

 Agribusiness Supply Chains

Identifying ways in which the agriculture sector in the Palestinian Territory can better reach its potential, contribute to the growth of the economy and help improve the livelihoods of thousands of Palestinians.

 Tourism

A programme focused on the development of the local Palestinian tourism sector to meet the needs of domestic and international visitors.

 Palestine Investment Conference

Encouraging foreign investment into Palestinian businesses.

 Handicrafts

An assessment of Palestinian handicrafts suitable for export.

 Gaza Private Sector Rapid Recovery

Analysis of the private sector in Gaza.

 Political Risk Insurance

Support for the development of a product that reduces political risk to exporting Palestinian companies.

 Israeli-Palestinian Chamber of Commerce

Encouraging cross-border business interaction and trade.

 Moon Valley Agricultural Exports

Aiding Palestinian farmers to market their produce to leading supermarkets.

 
Training and Entrepreneurship

 Tsofen

Helping male Israeli-Arab graduates participate in the Israeli hi-tech industry.

 Fellowship Programme

Addressing the skills gap in different economic sectors in the Palestinian Territory.

 Corporate Leadership Programme

An interactive programme that brought prominent global business leaders, international corporate trainers and professors to the Palestinian Territory.

 Entrepreneurs’ Training

A pilot project in the West Bank to help young Palestinians establish new businesses.

 On the Way to Business

An entrepreneurial training programme to enhance opportunities in the Galilee region.

Notable persons

Jonathan Kestenbaum, Baron Kestenbaum (born 1959), chief operating officer of investment trust RIT Capital Partners, and a Labour member of the House of Lords

Sources 
 Memorandum submitted by the Portland Trust to the International Development Select Committees House of Commons UK
The Portland Trust homepage
 http://www.portlandtrust.org/

References 

Peace organisations based in the United Kingdom
Non-governmental organizations involved in the Israeli–Palestinian peace process
Organizations established in 2003